Coeloglossum is a genus of flowering plants in the orchid family Orchidaceae. It has long been considered to have only one species, Coeloglossum viride, the frog orchid. Some recent classifications regard Coeloglossum as part of the larger genus, Dactylorhiza, so that C. viride becomes Dactylorhiza viridis. Other sources continue to keep Coeloglossum viride separate.

Under either name, the species has a wide distribution across the cooler parts of the Northern Hemisphere, covering much of Europe, non-tropical Asia (Russia, Japan, China, the Himalayas, etc.), much of Canada and parts of the United States (Alaska, Northeast, the Appalachians, Great Lakes Region, Northern Great Plains, and Rocky Mountains). It is typically found growing in moist, rich soil in wet meadows, moist or wet deciduous woods and thickets, and is frequently found on steep slopes.

Etymology 
The generic name Coeloglossum is derived from the Greek  meaning "hollow tongue",  referring to the hollow spur on the tongue-like labellum. The 'frog' in frog orchid refers to the shape and colour of the flowers.

Description 
Plant arises from fleshy, forked roots and ranges in height from 10 to 55 cm. The leaves of C. viride are 5–14 cm long and 2–7 cm wide; leaves at the base of the orchid are obovate to elliptical, while leaves higher on the stem become lanceolate. Two to six leaves are found on one plant, and leafing is alternate.

Inflorescence of the orchid is a dense raceme (spike-like cluster) containing 7 to 70 small flowers. Flowers are greenish in color, and often tinged with purple, reddish, or red-brown color. Flowers are subtended by conspicuous long, tapering bracts which are 1–6 cm long, with the lower bracts longer and typically greatly exceeding the length of the flower. Sepals are oval with little or no point, 3–7 mm long and 2–4 mm wide and dark green. Sepals join with petals to form a hood opposite the lower petal of the flower. Petals are long and narrow, 3.5–5 mm long and about 0.5 mm wide, and curve inwards. The lower petal is strap-shaped and usually split at the very tip to form two or three tooth-like divisions, with the middle tooth smaller than the others. It is 5–11 mm long and 1–4 mm wide. A 2–3 mm long nectar spur projects behind the labellum.

Coeloglossum viride flowers in late May and early June. It is either pollinated by bees and small wasps, or reproduces autogamously by incoherent pollinia; that is, the pollinia crumble and some pollen falls on the stigma, fertilizing the flower.

In North America, Coeloglossum viride can be mistaken for Platanthera flava (the pale green orchid), but can be best distinguished by the labellum, which is notched at the apex and does not have the tubercle of P. flava.

Ecology

Coeloglossum viride is mainly pollinated by beetles and a wide range of Hymenoptera including ants.

This orchid species is able to form symbiotic partnerships with a variety of mycorrhizal fungi including Ceratobasidium sp., Epulorhiza anaticulata Moniliopsis anomala, Rhizoctonia sp., Tulasnella cucumeris and Tulasnella calospora.

Uses 
Coeloglossum viride var. bracteatum is being investigated as a potential candidate for the treatment of vascular dementia.

Chemistry
The chemistry of Coeloglossum viride var. bracteatum is complex, featuring a wealth of bioactive constituents, at least seven of which are new to science and peculiar to the plant. Known compounds found thus far to be present are 4-hydroxybenzaldehyde, 4-hydroxybenzyl alcohol (=Gastrodigenin), 4,4'-dihydroxydibenzyl ether, 4,4'-dihydroxydiphenylmethane (see Xenoestrogen), 4-(4-hydroxybenzyloxy)benzyl alcohol, gastrodin, quercetin-3,7-diglucoside (see Flavonol glycoside), thymidine, loroglossin, militarine, dactylorhin A, dactylorhin B, β-Sitosterol and daucosterol.

References

External links 

Den virtuella floran - Distribution
Acta Plantarum

Orchids of Asia
Orchids of Europe
Orchids of North America
Monotypic Orchidoideae genera
Orchidoideae